John Rogers (May 9, 1813 – May 11, 1879) was an American businessman and politician who served one term as a Representative from New York from 1871 to 1873.

Biography
Rogers was born as John Weed in Caldwell, New York (now Lake George) on May 9, 1813. He completed preparatory studies, then moved to Black Brook in 1832.  Rogers engaged in the manufacture of iron as a partner of his brother James in a firm they named the J & J Rogers Iron Company.  In addition to the iron works, the Rogers' enterprises in and around Black Brook included a sawmill and a general store.  In 1844 John Weed had his name legally changed to John Rogers.

Rogers was Town Supervisor of Black Brook for ten years between 1839 and 1866 and held other local offices, including Postmaster.

Congress 
He was elected as a Democrat to the Forty-second Congress (March 4, 1871 - March 3, 1873).  He did not run for reelection in 1872, and resumed his business activities.

Death 
He died at "Rogers Place," his estate near Fort Edward and Moreau, on May 11, 1879.  He was interred in the family burial ground on his estate.

References

External links

1813 births
1879 deaths
People from Lake George, New York
People from Clinton County, New York
People from Fort Edward, New York
New York (state) postmasters
Town supervisors in New York (state)
Democratic Party members of the United States House of Representatives from New York (state)
Burials in New York (state)
19th-century American politicians